Carli Coetzee is a research associate and Africanist at the African Studies Centre of the University of Oxford focusing on African literature and African popular cultural studies. In 1988 she obtained a Master's degree in Afrikaans literature and in 1993 a PhD degree, both at the University of Cape Town. Coetzee held positions at the University of Western Cape, the University of Cape Town, SOAS University of London and Queen Mary University of London and was a Fellow at Harvard and Wits University. She is the Editor of the Journal of African Cultural Studies, United Kingdom, and is the vice-president of the African Studies Association of the United Kingdom.

Publications
Coetzee has published many scholarly articles and some books, including:
 'N Ondersoek na die aard van poësie, met verwysing na kinderpoësie en die "eenvoudige" poësie van N.P. van Wyk Louw en D.J. Opperman, Master's Thesis Dissertation, University of Cape Town, 1988. In Afrikaans. (Translated title: An inquiry into the nature of poetry, with reference to children's poetry and the "simple" poetry of N.P. van Wyk Louw and D.J. Opperman.)
 Writing the South African landscape, PhD Thesis, Dissertation, University of Cape Town, 1993.
 with Sarah Nuttall: Negotiating the past : the making of memory in South Africa, Oxford University Press, Cape Town, 1998.
 Accented futures : language activism and the ending of apartheid, Wits University Press, Johannesburg, 2013.
 (as Editor): Afropolitanism : reboot, Routledge, London, 2017.
 with Moradewun Adejunmobi (Eds): Routledge handbook of African literature, Routledge, Abingdon, Oxon, 2019.
 Written under the Skin. Blood and Intergenerational Memory in South Africa, Boydell & Brewer, Melton, 2019.

External links

 . Video. Revue Biens symboliques / Symbolic Goods, 24 January 2022. Duration 22m 42s. European Symposium of Social Science and Humanities Journals, Bruxelles, 23/11/2021.

References

Academics of Queen Mary University of London
Academics of SOAS University of London
Academics of the University of Oxford
British Africanists
Harvard Fellows
Living people

Academic staff of the University of Cape Town
University of Cape Town alumni
Academic staff of the University of the Western Cape
Academic staff of the University of the Witwatersrand

Year of birth missing (living people)